Josué de Jesús Bustos Ortiz (born November 15, 1992, in Poza Rica, Veracruz) is a professional Mexican footballer who currently plays for Coras de Nayarit F.C. He is nicknamed "El Pez" (The Fish). National Champion with "Zacatepec 1948" team (Segunda División Liga de Nuevos Talentos, Torneo Clausura 2014).

References

External links

1992 births
Living people
Mexican footballers
Garzas UAEH footballers
Selva Cañera footballers
Club Atlético Zacatepec players
Gavilanes de Matamoros footballers
Coras de Nayarit F.C. footballers
Liga MX players
Ascenso MX players
Liga Premier de México players
Tercera División de México players
Footballers from Veracruz
People from Poza Rica
Association football forwards